Seagoing cowboys is a term used for men and ships used from 1945 to 1947 for United Nations Relief and Rehabilitation Administration and the Brethren Service Committee of the Church of the Brethren that sent livestock to war-torn countries. These seagoing cowboys made about 360 trips on 73 different ships. Most of the ships were converted World War II cargo ships with added cages and horse stalls. The Heifers for Relief project was started by the Church of the Brethren in 1942; in 1953 this became Heifer International. In the wake of the destruction caused by the Second World War, the historical peace churches in the United States (Church of the Brethren, the Society of Friends or "Quakers," and the Mennonites) sponsored relief missions to war-ravaged Europe, typically in cooperation with the United Nations Relief and Rehabilitation Administration (UNRRA). These relief missions usually took the form of transporting farm animals (such as heifers or horses), by transatlantic ship, to Poland and other countries where much of the livestock had been killed in the war. The men who tended the animals aboard these boats were called seagoing cowboys. These ships moved horses, heifers, and mules as well as chicks, rabbits, and goats. Ten seagoing cowboys died on the  when it sank after accidental grounding in the Gulf of Finland on December 25, 1947.

The Seagoing cowboys delivered to: Albania, China, Czechoslovakia (unloading in Bremen, Germany), Ethiopia, Greece, Italy, Poland, and Yugoslavia (unloading in Trieste, Italy). A total of 239,377 hoofed animals were transported. Over 7,000 men from the United States and Canada enlisted to be seagoing cowboys. Some 366 seagoing cowboys were from the Civilian Public Service.

Heifer International
Heifer International, an organization founded by a member of the Church of the Brethren, mirrors those war relief programs by continuing, in the 21st century, to operate international relief missions that promote sustainable community agriculture by giving heifers and other farm animals to help people around the world. The organization encourages recipients to "pass on the gift," so that recipients become donors once the animal they receive produces offspring.

Exhibit and conferences
On May 10, 2010 some surviving Seagoing Cowboys came to Funderburg Library at Manchester College in North Manchester, Indiana for the dedication of the permanent Seagoing Cowboys exhibit put on by the Dan West and Heifer International. 

A sixtieth anniversary conference commemorating and studying the historical significance of the seagoing cowboys in these relief efforts from 1946 through 1948 was held August 12–14, 2005, at the Church of the Brethren Service Center in New Windsor, Maryland.

From the 60th anniversary Seagoing Cowboys conference: "From 1946-48, more than 4,000 cows passed through the town of Union Bridge, Maryland on their way to the port of Baltimore where they were loaded onto liberty ships for Europe. The 'seagoing cowboys' who accompanied and cared for these animals came from farms across America. They had one goal in mind: to provide a continuous supply of milk to the children and their families of war-torn Europe by replenishing their lost livestock. This effort was known as Heifer Relief."

One of the cowboys was the future scientist Owen Gingerich.

Ships
 23 Liberty ships were used:  
(15 seagoing cowboys and with about 340 horses each trip)
(15 seagoing cowboys)
Type C4-class ship: . (80 cowboys, made five trips to Poland with about 1,500 horses each trip)
 46 Victory ships with about 32 cowboys on each trip: (ships were temporary conversions of WW2 cargo ships, each make from 3 to 8 trips, with about 750 horses each trip)

 
 	
 
 
 Sank with loss of 10 crew

See also
 List of Victory ships
 Liberty ship
 Type C2 ship
 Type C3 ship

References

External links
 Seagoing cowboys website
 Heifer Project website
 Cowboys at Christmas
 Seagoing Cowboys and the Heifer Project: The Maryland Story by Peggy Reiff Miller
 “Seagoing Cowboy” now living in Riverdale to be  honored at art exhibit at Merchant Marine Academy
 A seagoing cowboy returns to Gdańsk after 68 years

Aftermath of World War II in the United States
Humanitarian aid organizations of World War II
Aftermath of World War II in Poland
Mennonitism in the United States
Quakerism in the United States